The men's 3000 metres steeplechase event at the 1994 World Junior Championships in Athletics was held in Lisbon, Portugal, at Estádio Universitário de Lisboa on 21 and 23 July.

Medalists

Results

Final
23 July

Heats
21 July

Heat 1

Heat 2

Participation
According to an unofficial count, 21 athletes from 15 countries participated in the event.

References

3000 metres steeplechasechase
Steeplechase at the World Athletics U20 Championships